Cagnò is a comune (municipality) in Trentino in the northern Italian region Trentino-Alto Adige/Südtirol, located about  north of Trento.

Cagnò borders the following municipalities: Laurein, Proveis, Rumo, Revò, Livo, and Cles.

Demographic evolution

References

Cities and towns in Trentino-Alto Adige/Südtirol